Plagiantha is a genus of Brazilian plants in the grass family. The only known species is Plagiantha tenella, native to the state of Bahia in eastern Brazil.

References

Panicoideae
Endemic flora of Brazil
Grasses of South America
Flora of Bahia
Monotypic Poaceae genera